The 1957 Notre Dame Fighting Irish baseball team represented the University of Notre Dame in the 1957 NCAA University Division baseball season. The Fighting Irish played their home games at Cartier Field. The team was coached by Jake Kline in his 24th year as head coach at Notre Dame.

The Fighting Irish won the District IV playoff to advance to the College World Series, where they were defeated by the Penn State Nittany Lions.

Roster

Schedule

|-
! style="" | Regular Season
|-

|-
! bgcolor="#DDDDFF" width="3%" | #
! bgcolor="#DDDDFF" width="7%" | Date
! bgcolor="#DDDDFF" width="14%" | Opponent
! bgcolor="#DDDDFF" width="25%" | Site/Stadium
! bgcolor="#DDDDFF" width="5%" | Score
! bgcolor="#DDDDFF" width="5%" | Overall Record
|- align="center" bgcolor="#ccffcc"
| 1 || April 12 || at  || Jordan Field • Bloomington, Indiana || 6–1 || 1–0
|- align="center" bgcolor="#ccffcc"
| 2 || April 13 || at Indiana || Jordan Field • Bloomington, Indiana || 9–7 || 2–0
|- align="center" bgcolor="#ffcccc"
| 3 || April 13 || at Indiana || Jordan Field • Bloomington, Indiana || 0–3 || 2–1
|- align="center" bgcolor="#ccffcc"
| 4 || April 16 ||  || Cartier Field • Notre Dame, Indiana || 3–2 || 3–1
|- align="center" bgcolor="#ffcccc"
| 5 || April 20 || at  || Ray Fisher Stadium • Ann Arbor, Michigan || 4–5 || 3–2
|- align="center" bgcolor="#ffcccc"
| 6 || April 20 || at Michigan || Ray Fisher Stadium • Ann Arbor, Michigan || 0–3 || 3–3
|- align="center" bgcolor="#ccffcc"
| 7 || April 26 || at  || Unknown • Athens, Ohio || 8–3 || 4–3
|- align="center" bgcolor="#ffcccc"
| 8 || April 27 || at Ohio || Unknown • Athens, Ohio || 4–7 || 4–4
|- align="center" bgcolor="#ffcccc"
| 9 || April 30 ||  || Cartier Field • Notre Dame, Indiana || 3–4 || 4–5
|-

|-
! bgcolor="#DDDDFF" width="3%" | #
! bgcolor="#DDDDFF" width="7%" | Date
! bgcolor="#DDDDFF" width="14%" | Opponent
! bgcolor="#DDDDFF" width="25%" | Site/Stadium
! bgcolor="#DDDDFF" width="5%" | Score
! bgcolor="#DDDDFF" width="5%" | Overall Record
|- align="center" bgcolor="#ccffcc"
| 10 || May 1 || at Northwestern || Dyche Field • Evanston, Illinois || 8–4 || 5–5
|- align="center" bgcolor="#ccffcc"
| 11 || May 4 || Glenview Naval Air Station || Cartier Field • Notre Dame, Indiana || 12–1 || 6–5
|- align="center" bgcolor="#ccffcc"
| 12 || May 6 ||  || Cartier Field • Notre Dame, Indiana || 4–1 || 7–5
|- align="center" bgcolor="#ffcccc"
| 13 || May 7 || Wisconsin || Cartier Field • Notre Dame, Indiana || 9–14 || 7–6
|- align="center" bgcolor="#ccffcc"
| 14 || May 9 || Michigan || Cartier Field • Notre Dame, Indiana || 14–0 || 8–6
|- align="center" bgcolor="#ccffcc"
| 15 || May 11 || Great Lakes Naval Air Station || Cartier Field • Notre Dame, Indiana || 9–0 || 9–6
|- align="center" bgcolor="#ccffcc"
| 16 || May 13 || at Michigan State || Old College Field • East Lansing, Michigan || 3–1 || 10–6
|- align="center" bgcolor="#ccffcc"
| 17 || May 15 || Northwestern || Cartier Field • Notre Dame, Indiana || 6–2 || 11–6
|-

|-
! style="" | Postseason
|-

|-
! bgcolor="#DDDDFF" width="3%" | #
! bgcolor="#DDDDFF" width="7%" | Date
! bgcolor="#DDDDFF" width="14%" | Opponent
! bgcolor="#DDDDFF" width="25%" | Site/Stadium
! bgcolor="#DDDDFF" width="5%" | Score
! bgcolor="#DDDDFF" width="5%" | Overall Record
|- align="center" bgcolor="#ccffcc"
| 18 || May 28 || vs  || Hyames Field • Kalamazoo, Michigan || 18–2 || 12–6
|- align="center" bgcolor="#ccffcc"
| 19 || May 29 || at  || Hyames Field • Kalamazoo, Michigan || 4–2 || 13–6
|- align="center" bgcolor="#ffcccc"
| 20 || May 30 || vs Northwestern || Hyames Field • Kalamazoo, Michigan || 2–9 || 13–7
|- align="center" bgcolor="#ccffcc"
| 21 || May 31 || vs Northwestern || Hyames Field • Kalamazoo, Michigan || 6–1 || 14–7
|-

|-
! bgcolor="#DDDDFF" width="3%" | #
! bgcolor="#DDDDFF" width="7%" | Date
! bgcolor="#DDDDFF" width="14%" | Opponent
! bgcolor="#DDDDFF" width="25%" | Site/Stadium
! bgcolor="#DDDDFF" width="5%" | Score
! bgcolor="#DDDDFF" width="5%" | Overall Record
|- align="center" bgcolor="#ffcccc"
| 22 || June 2 || at Western Michigan || Hyames Field • Kalamazoo, Michigan || 2–4 || 14–8
|-

|-
! bgcolor="#DDDDFF" width="3%" | #
! bgcolor="#DDDDFF" width="7%" | Date
! bgcolor="#DDDDFF" width="14%" | Opponent
! bgcolor="#DDDDFF" width="25%" | Site/Stadium
! bgcolor="#DDDDFF" width="5%" | Score
! bgcolor="#DDDDFF" width="5%" | Overall Record
|- align="center" bgcolor="#ffcccc"
| 23 || June 8 || vs Iowa State || Omaha Municipal Stadium • Omaha, Nebraska || 8–13 || 14–9
|- align="center" bgcolor="#ccffcc"
| 24 || June 9 || vs Colorado State || Omaha Municipal Stadium • Omaha, Nebraska || 23–2 || 15–9
|- align="center" bgcolor="#ccffcc"
| 25 || June 10 || vs Texas || Omaha Municipal Stadium • Omaha, Nebraska || 9–0 || 16–9
|- align="center" bgcolor="#ffcccc"
| 26 || June 11 || vs Penn State || Omaha Municipal Stadium • Omaha, Nebraska || 4–5 || 16–10
|-

|-
|

Awards and honors 
Elmer Kohorst
First Team All-American American Baseball Coaches Association

References

Notre Dame Fighting Irish baseball seasons
Notre Dame Fighting Irish baseball
College World Series seasons
Notre Dame